was a Japanese football player and manager. He played for Japan national team.

National team career

Oita was born in Tokyo on April 9, 1914. In 1936, when he was a Tokyo Imperial University student, he was selected Japan national team for 1936 Summer Olympics in Berlin. At this competition, on August 4, he debuted against Sweden. Although he was a midfielder, he played as a defender. Japan completed a come-from-behind victory against Sweden. The first victory in Olympics for the Japan and the historic victory over one of the powerhouses became later known as "Miracle of Berlin" (ベルリンの奇跡) in Japan. In 2016, this team was selected Japan Football Hall of Fame. On August 7, he also played against Italy. He played 2 games for Japan in 1936.

Coaching career
After retirement, in 1947, Oita became a manager for new club Sumitomo Metal and managed until 1956.

September 11, 1996, Oita died of heart failure in Bunkyo, Tokyo at the age of 82.

National team statistics

References

External links
 
 
 Japan National Football Team Database
Japan Football Hall of Fame (Japan team at 1936 Olympics) at Japan Football Association
 

1914 births
1996 deaths
University of Tokyo alumni
Association football people from Tokyo
Japanese footballers
Japan international footballers
Olympic footballers of Japan
Footballers at the 1936 Summer Olympics
Japanese football managers
Association football midfielders